The Behenian fixed stars are a selection of fifteen stars considered especially useful for magical applications in the medieval astrology of Europe and the Arab world. Their name derives from Arabic bahman, "root," as each was considered a source of astrological power for one or more planets. Each is also connected with a gemstone and plant that would be used in rituals meant to draw the star's influence (e.g., into a talisman). When a planet was within six degrees of an associated star, this influence was thought to be particularly strong.

Heinrich Cornelius Agrippa discussed them in his Three Books of Occult Philosophy (Book II, chapters 47 & 52) as the Behenii (singular Behenius), describing their magical workings and kabbalistic symbols. He attributed these to Hermes Trismegistus, as was common with occult traditions in the Middle Ages. Their true origin remains unknown, though Sir Wallis Budge suspects a possible Sumerian source.

The following table uses symbols from a 1531 quarto edition of Agrippa, but other forms exist. Where the name used in old texts differs from the one in use today, the modern form is given first.

Table of Behenian Stars

See also
Astrotheology

Notes

References

Citations

Works cited

Budge, E. A. Wallis (1930). Amulets and Superstitions. London, Oxford University Press. , 
Robson, Vivian E. (1979). The Fixed Stars & Constellations in Astrology. Samuel Weiser. ,

External links
Hermes Trismegistus on the Fifteen Fixed Stars features alternate symbols.
Constellations of Words has star lore from a variety of scholarly sources.

Stellar groupings
Technical factors of Western astrology
History of astrology